The singles discography of Connie Smith, an American country artist, consists of 47 singles, one music video and one additional charting song. After signing with RCA Victor Records in 1964, Smith released her debut single in August entitled "Once a Day". The song topped the Billboard Magazine Hot Country Singles chart by November and held the position for eight weeks, to date being the longest running song at number one by a female country artist. The single's success launched Smith into stardom, making Smith one of the decade's most successful female artists. The follow-up single "Then and Only Then" reached #4 on the country singles chart, while its flip side ("Tiny Blue Transistor Radio") went to #25 on the same chart. All of Smith's singles released between 1965 and 1968 reached the top 10 on the Billboard country songs chart, including "If I Talk to Him", "Ain't Had No Lovin'", and "Cincinnati, Ohio". By 1969 Smith felt highly pressured from her career and cut back on promoting singles.  Smith's chart success slightly declined because of this, with songs like "Ribbon of Darkness" (1969) and "Louisiana Man" (1970) only reaching the top 20. Other singles continued to peak within the top 10 including "I Never Once Stopped Loving You" (1970) and "Just One Time" (1971).

In 1972 all three of Smith's singles reached the top 10 on the Billboard Hot Country Singles chart: "Just for What I Am" (#5), "If It Ain't Love (Let's Leave It Alone)" (#7), and "Love Is the Look You're Looking for" (#8). After signing with Columbia Records in 1973 Smith incorporated more Gospel music into her albums and chart success declined slightly. Many of her singles continued to remain in the top 20 including "Ain't Love a Good Thing" (1973) and "I Never Knew (What That Song Meant Before)" (1974). The following year Smith released a cover version of Hank Williams' "Why Don't You Love Me" (#15) and in 1976 covered The Everly Brothers' "(Till) I Kissed You" (#10). In 1977 Smith signed with Monument Records, which updated her to a country pop-focused sound. In 1978 her cover of Andy Gibb's number one single "I Just Want to Be Your Everything" became Smith's only single to become a major hit under Monument, reaching #14 on the Billboard country singles list. The remainder of her singles reached progressively-lower positions on the country chart and in 1979, Smith left Monument. In 1985 Smith returned on Epic Records with the single "A Far Cry from You", which peaked at #71 and became her final chart appearance.

Singles

As lead artist

As a collaborative artist

Other charted songs

Music videos

See also 
 Connie Smith albums discography
 List of artists who reached number one on the U.S. country chart
 List of number-one country hits (United States)
 List of years in country music

Notes

References

External links 
 Connie Smith — discography

Discographies of American artists
Country music discographies
Connie Smith songs